Bascom Headon Palmer Sr. (? - April 2, 1916) was a state legislator and judge in Florida. He was a Democrat and represented Columbia County, Florida in the Florida House of Representatives He then represented the 14th District in the Florida Senate from 1895 to 1901. In 1901 he was appointed a judge.

He had two sons.

His namesake was a doctor in the military. He became prominent Opthalmologist. The Bascom Palmer Eye Institute is named for him.

References

1916 deaths

Year of birth missing